The 2015–16 Florida Gators men's basketball team represented the University of Florida in the sport of basketball during the 2015–16 NCAA Division I men's basketball season. This was the Gators' first season since 1995-96 without long-time head coach Billy Donovan, as he left the Gators to become the new head coach of the NBA's Oklahoma City Thunder. The Gators, led by first year head coach Mike White, competed in the Southeastern Conference (SEC) and played their home games in the O'Connell Center on the university's Gainesville, Florida campus. They finished the season 21–15, 9–9 in SEC play to finish in a tie for eighth place. They lost to Texas A&M in the quarterfinals of the SEC tournament. They received an invitation to the National Invitation Tournament, where they defeated North Florida and Ohio State to advance to the quarterfinals where they lost to  George Washington.

Previous season
The Gators finished the 2014–15 season 16–17, 8–10 in SEC play to finish in a tie for eighth place. They advanced to the quarterfinals of the SEC tournament where they lost to Kentucky. They did not participate in a postseason tournament for the first time in 17 years.

Departures

Recruiting class of 2015

Recruiting class of 2016

Roster

Schedule

|-
!colspan=12 style="background:#0021A5; color:white;"| Exhibition

|-
!colspan=12 style="background:#0021A5; color:white;"| Regular season

|-
!colspan=12 style="text-align: center; background:#0021A5"| SEC Tournament

|-
!colspan=12 style="text-align: center; background:#0021A5"| National Invitation Tournament

See also
2015–16 Florida Gators women's basketball team

References

Florida Gators men's basketball seasons
Florida
Florida